Moosomin is a word borrowed from the Cree language meaning low-bush cranberry or squash berry (Viburnum edule).

People
Chief Moosomin – a famous leader of the Cree in the 19th century

Electoral districts
Moosomin (N.W.T. electoral district) – a territorial electoral district in the Northwest Territories from 1885 to 1905
Moosomin (electoral district) – a current provincial electoral district in Saskatchewan

Places
Rural Municipality of Moosomin No. 121, Saskatchewan
Moosomin, Saskatchewan –a town in Saskatchewan named after Chief Moosomin
Moosomin Airport – a municipal airport serving Moosomin Saskatchewan
Moosomin Lake

Indigenous cuisine in Canada
Cree language